Jerzy Janowicz was the defending champion, but decided to play in Sevilla instead.

Édouard Roger-Vasselin won against Arnaud Clément 6–4, 6–3 in the final and swept the title.

Seeds

Draw

Finals

Top half

Bottom half

References
 Main Draw
 Qualifying Draw

Trophee des Alpilles - Singles
2011 Singles